Walkerwood Reservoir is a reservoir in the Brushes valley above Stalybridge in Greater Manchester, built in the 19th century to provide a supply of safe drinking water.  It is owned and operated by United Utilities.

The revetment was increasing vulnerable to wave action so has been strengthened by filling existing holes in the concrete with lean sand asphalt (LSA) and overlaying with open stone asphalt (OSA).

Capacity

See also 
 Brushes Reservoir
 Lower Swineshaw Reservoir
 Higher Swineshaw Reservoir

References 

Reservoirs in Greater Manchester